The 2001–02 Wisconsin Badgers men's basketball team represented University of Wisconsin–Madison. The head coach was Bo Ryan, coaching his first season with the Badgers. The team played its home games at the Kohl Center in Madison, Wisconsin and was a member of the Big Ten Conference. Wisconsin finished 19-13, 11-5 in Big Ten play to finish as regular season co-champions with Illinois and Indiana. The Badgers received an at-large bid to the NCAA tournament as a No. 8 seed in the East Region, where they lost to No. 1 seed and eventual champion Maryland in the second round.

Roster

Schedule

|-
!colspan=12| Regular Season

|-
!colspan=12| Big Ten tournament

|-
!colspan=12| NCAA tournament

References

Wisconsin Badgers men's basketball seasons
Wisconsin
Wisconsin
Badge
Badge